Hendrina Martha Afrikaner (1952–2011) was Chief of the Orlam Afrikaners in Namibia, the first woman to occupy that position.

Early life 
Afrikaner was the great-granddaughter of Jan Jonker Afrikaner.

She grew up in Hoachanas and Okahandja where she attended the Augustineum.

Career 
Afrikaner worked as a nurse when she was in her twenties. After Namibian independence she joined the Ministries of Education, and of Gender Equality and Child Welfare.

She became chief of the Afrikaner clan in 2004 and occupied that position until her death.

In 2016, Eduard Afrikaner (b.1948) was elected as the chief.

Death 
Hendrina Afrikaner died on 19 August 2011 in a car accident between Keetmanshoop and Tses, and was buried next to Jan Jonker Afrikaner in Okahandja.

References

1952 births
2011 deaths
Namibian politicians
Road incident deaths in Namibia
Augustineum Secondary School alumni